Dariusz Maciej Grabowski (born 28 August 1950 in Warsaw) is a Polish politician and Member of the European Parliament (MEP) for the Masovian Voivodship with the League of Polish Families, part of the Union for Europe of the Nations Group and sits on the European Parliament's Committee on Budgets.

Grabowski is a substitute member on the European Parliament's Committee on Budgetary Control and the Committee on Economic and Monetary Affairs.

He was awarded a master's degree in economics in 1973, and achieved a Doctorate in Economics from the University of Warsaw in 1978.

Career
 1973-1999: Researcher, Department of Economics, University of Warsaw
 1989-1997: own business
 1999-2000: Member of the Parliament of the Republic of Poland, terms 1997–2001, 2001–2004, Chairman of the Committee on Cooperative Banks
 2003-2004: Member of the Council of Europe
 2003-2004: Vice-Chairman of the Central Council of the League of Polish Families
 2004: Vice-Chairman of the Committee for Social Legislation

See also 
 2004 European Parliament election in Poland

External links
 
 

1950 births
Living people
Politicians from Warsaw
Candidates in the 2000 Polish presidential election
League of Polish Families MEPs
Movement for Reconstruction of Poland politicians
MEPs for Poland 2004–2009